M. A. C. Horne FCIT, who wrote as Mike Horne, was a British transport writer who specialised in the history of London's railways. He died of a heart attack on 26 March 2020 (not connected with COVID-19).

Selected publications
 The Victoria Line - A short history (1988) 
 The Northern Line (second edn 1999) 
 The Jubilee Line (2000) 
 The Bakerloo Line (second edn 2001) 
 The Metropolitan Line (2003) 
 The Victoria Line (second edition 2004) 
 The District Line (2006) 
 The Piccadilly Tube - A History of the First Hundred Years (2007)  (Hardback)
 London’s District Railway: A History of the Metropolitan District Railway. (2018) 
 The Last Link - The First 30 Years of the Hampstead Railway 
 150 Years of the Hammersmith & City Railway Published jointly with London Underground Ltd 
 The Aldwych Branch of the Piccadilly Line (with Antony Badsey-Ellis). Capital Transport 2009

References

External links 
Books published by Mike Horne and list of errors and omissions

Living people
British non-fiction writers
Fellows of the Chartered Institute of Transport
Railway historians
Year of birth missing (living people)